Oxynoemacheilus kaynaki, the medil loach, is a species of stome loach which is found in the Göksu, a right hand tributary of the Euphrates in southeast Anatolia, Turkey.

The fish is named in honor of Hüseyin Kaynak, the father of senior author.

References

kaynaki
Taxa named by Füsun Erk'akan
Taxa named by Cevher Özeren
Taxa named by Teodor T. Nalbant
Fish described in 2008